This is a list of listed buildings in the parish of Buittle in Dumfries and Galloway, Scotland.

List 

|}

Key

See also 
List of listed buildings in Dumfries and Galloway

Notes

References
All entries, addresses and coordinates are based on data from Historic Scotland. This data falls under the Open Government Licence

Buittle